The roundtail chub (Gila robusta) is a cyprinid fish in the genus Gila, of southwestern North America. It is native to the Colorado River drainage basin, including the Gila River and other tributaries, and in several other rivers. It is part of the “robusta complex”, which includes the Gila robusta robusta, G.r. grahami, and G.r. seminuda.

Description 
The body of the roundtail chub is significantly larger forward of the dorsal fin, and posteriorly it is tapered towards the tail. The forehead area is concave. The mouth is largish, but does not reach as far as the pupil of the eye, and is overhung by the snout. The tail is deeply forked. Color is a grayish brown above, and a lighter shade below. Mature males sometimes acquire red-orange lower cheeks and paired fins during breeding season. Recently, it has been recorded at up to 43 cm in length. 
Roundtail chub are also described to be “trout-like” because they possess a large mouth with the lower lip outlined in black. However, they lack the adipose fins found on trout species.

Range 
Its range of is within the Colorado River drainage basin, found from the headwaters down to the mouth, in Utah, Colorado, Arizona, Nevada, and California, and northwest Mexico; as well as in other rivers of northwestern Mexico.

This species is rather variable, and formerly accounted as several species, until intermediate forms were discovered. Recognized subspecies include:
 Gila robusta grahami
 Gila robusta jordani - small streams along the White River (Nevada)
 Gila robusta robusta - small rivers
 Gila robusta seminuda

The roundtail chub has been extirpated from the Zuni and San Francisco Rivers of New Mexico.

In Arizona, specifically in Gila, Mohave, and Yavapai Counties, the roundtail chub occupies several tributaries: Fossil Creek, Oak Creek, Burro Creek, Francis Creek, Big Sandy River, Santa Maria River, Boulder Creek, Trout Creek, Sycamore Creek, Beaverhead Springs, and throughout the Verde River. It is also found in the Gila River and the Rio Yaqui

Biology 
Roundtail chub is very prolific in nature.

Diet 
Roundtail chub is a voracious predator, consuming large amounts of fish, crayfish, frogs, and insects. Roundtail chub adults primarily consume aquatic and terrestrial insects, other fishes, and sometimes algae. Roundtail chub juveniles eat smaller insects, crustaceans, and algae.

Conservation
The decreasing population of the roundtail chub  is primarily the result of habitat loss as well as predation and competition by non-native fish. Although the populations in the Salt and Verde Rivers were stable ten years ago, they have been exponentially decreasing. Recent conservation efforts include more research to determine the mechanisms of their sudden disappearance, and population surveys conducted by the Arizona Game and Fish and US Forest Service (in progress).

Arizona Game and Fish Department considers roundtail chub a sport fish. They put up a strong fight for anglers, and the meat is described as "firm, white and very mild tasting." Intermuscular bones or floating bones are present, which can be cut out prior to cooking.

It is a candidate endangered species of the United States Fish and Wildlife Service, under the Endangered Species Act criteria.

References

Ira La Rivers, Fishes and Fisheries of Nevada (University of Nevada Press, 1994), pp. 388–390

Chubs (fish)
Gila (fish)
Chub
Chub
Chub
Chub
Chub
Chub
Fish described in 1853
Taxa named by Spencer Fullerton Baird
Taxa named by Charles Frédéric Girard